Mermaid's glove is a common name referring to two different organisms:

Dictyota binghamiae, a seaweed
Haliclona oculata, a sponge